The Rotorua Branch is a railway line from Putāruru to Rotorua, in the Waikato and Bay of Plenty regions of the North Island of New Zealand. Construction of the line was commenced by the Thames Valley and Rotorua Railway Company and finished by the Public Works Department (PWD). The complete line,  in length, opened in two sections; on 24 November 1893 to Tārukenga and the final  to Rotorua on 8 December 1894.

History
The line was partially constructed by the Thames Valley and Rotorua Railway Company. The company began planning of the line from 1877, following the passing of the District Railways Act 1877. Construction of the Rotorua line did not begin until after its survey, from 1881. The survey took 12 months to find a suitable route to Rotorua over the Mamaku Ranges.

The company only ever completed the section between Morrinsville and Tīrau (called Oxford at that time), and this opened on 8 March 1886. The Government took over its operations in 1886. From this time onwards, PWD undertook construction of the line, letting it in a series of contracts from March 1887, Daniel Fallon's Ngātira and Kaponga (Mamaku) contracts being first, then John Maclean and Sons to Tārukenga, the line there being opened on 24 November 1893. The line from Tārukenga to Rotorua was begun by Stewart and Hunter in 1887. The section to Lichfield on what is now the Kinleith Branch line was opened just before the Mount Tarawera eruption (21 June 1886). The line to Rotorua was opened by Prime Minister, Richard Seddon, on Saturday 8 December 1894.

In 1879 George Vesey Stewart and others proposed a railway between Tauranga and Rotorua, but this did not eventuate.

The Rotorua line in its original form was a mainline which ran from Morrinsville through to Rotorua. With the opening of the Kaimai Tunnel in 1978, the section of line between Morrinsville and Waharoa became part of the East Coast Main Trunk line between Hamilton and Kawerau, whilst the section of line between Waharoa and Kinleith became the Kinleith Branch line. The section of line between Putāruru and Rotorua becoming the Rotorua Branch line.

Gisborne proposal
The line from Rotorua was planned to become part of a line being built from Gisborne to link with Auckland via Te Teko and Rotorua. Only the Gisborne end of this proposed line was started, which later became known as the Moutohora Branch and the proposal to connect it with Auckland was later changed to be with the East Coast Main Trunk line via Tauranga, following a 1911 survey.

Taupo extension proposals

Extension of the line to Taupō had been proposed several times over the years, primarily to take advantage of forestry traffic from the region. One such proposal got as far as the construction phase in 1928, however, due to the onset of the Great Depression, work ceased a year later in 1929.

Paengaroa-Rotorua line proposal
In 1968 NZR announced a proposal to construct a new line to Rotorua from Paengaroa on the East Coast Main Trunk, with an extension to the Waipa State Mill. An extension to Taupo was also seen by NZR "as being very attractive". This proposal followed from the recommendations of a 1963 Commission of Inquiry report to investigate "Improved Access by Land to the Port of Tauranga and Bay of Plenty", which recommended:
 The construction of a deviation from Waharoa to Apata through the Kaimai Range, and the closure of the Paeroa to Apata section of the East Coast Main Trunk.
 The construction of a Rotorua to Paengaroa deviation to eliminate the Mamaku Bank on the Rotorua Branch.
 An extension of the Rotorua Branch to the Waipa State Mill.

The proposal created much attention both in support and against the idea, in particular with the proposed siting of new marshalling yards at Ngapuna, together with extending the existing Rotorua Branch line with a level crossing across Fenton Street. The proposal became a hot political debate and by 1973 NZR started to back down on the proposal and the scheme fell through shortly after.

Services
Two named passenger services operated on the line. The Rotorua Express was initiated in 1894 and in 1930 became the Rotorua Limited - the most prestigious train in New Zealand at that time. The service later reverted to the Rotorua Express with more stops; and in 1959 was replaced by 88-seater Fiat railcars. This railcar service ceased in 1968. In 1991 a new twice daily tourist-oriented service called the Geyserland Express was initiated, using Silver Fern railcars. This service lasted a decade and ceased in 2001.

Freight on the line previously comprised forestry and livestock products railed north from Rotorua. Train loads north were limited by the Tārukenga Bank west of Rotorua between Ngongotahā and Mamaku, with a steep ruling gradient of 1 in 35.

In 1995 Tranz Rail launched the "Bay Raider" service, utilising roadrailer wagons able to run on rail and road, to connect Auckland, Rotorua, Napier and Gisborne. Between Rotorua and Napier the road railers operated in "road" mode.

The forestry industry operated numerous sawmills on the branch line; the largest was at Mamaku, which had its own bush tramway connecting to the NZR line. For many years after World War II sheep and cattle from land developments south of Rotorua were railed by special stock trains to the large abattoirs or freezing works in the South Auckland suburbs of Westfield and Southdown. Now there are local freezing works served by road transport, and stock numbers (particularly sheep) have reduced.

Stations 
The stations were -

Rotorua station relocation

In 1989 the Rotorua central city station and rail yard was closed and, along with the last 2 km of the line, removed and relocated to a new site at Koutu.

The Geyserland Express railcar service initially terminated in the Koutu freight yard until a small temporary passenger station operated by the Second Chance Train Trust opened on the northern side of the Lake Road overbridge in 1995. The new passenger station at Koutu was intended as temporary measure until the line could be relaid to a proposed new passenger station in the central city on the corner of Ranolf and Amohau Streets, which was being pursued by the Second Chance Train Trust and the Rotorua District Council. In June 1995 the Rotorua District Council considered a report for building a new terminal, but the new station never eventuated.

Decline

During the late 1990s traffic on the line gradually declined with the twice-daily Geyserland Express railcar service being reduced in 1995 to a daily service with twice-daily services on Fridays and Sundays only, and in 1996 reduced to a daily service on all days. The nightly Bay Raider freight service was cancelled in 2000 and the Geyserland Express was cancelled in 2001.

Since this time the line has fallen into disrepair, with slips, overgrown vegetation and sections of the line being stolen.

In 2012, the Rotorua District Council demolished the Lake Road overbridge at Koutu to enable the widening of Lake Road to four lanes, to be built across the railway line at this locality. The new four-lane road was built over the top of the track, which now separates the former Koutu freight yard from the mainline. The bridge had been built in 1937 to replace a level crossing. New Zealand Railways Corporation still own the rail corridor across the road south through to Pukuatua Street.

The former rail corridor south of Pukuatua Street has since been relinquished and now been developed over in conjunction with a retail development on the neighbouring former Telecom depot site.

Reopening
On 13 January 2009, the Geyserland Express Trust announced that it had commissioned and received a report on the feasibility of reopening the line between Putaruru and Rotorua, which put the cost of doing so at $8.3 million.  Work required included:
 Clearing vegetation
 Replacing missing sections of track
 Rehabilitation of some of the bridges
 Checking drains and culverts
 Establishing a new station at Rotorua

The interested parties planned to establish a working group to determine the level of demand and economic feasibility of services on the line.

In December 2009 KiwiRail leased the Rotorua Branch line (Putaruru - Koutu) to the Rotorua Ngongotaha Rail Trust, which has since worked on plans to turn the unused corridor and track into a tourism venture. The trust has restored part of the line and did initially have discussions with the Rotorua District Council to assist with its plans to continue the national cycleway system in the District at the time of acquiring the line. The trust hopes that when the line is fully repaired, it will be possible for freight and passenger services to resume, with steam enthusiast operators from around New Zealand, able to bring their own excursion trains to Rotorua.

Mamaku-based adventure tourism company Rail Riders have been granted a rail operating licence to run services on the Rotorua Branch. Working with KiwiRail and the Rotorua-Ngongotaha Rail Trust, the company operates its New Zealand-designed and built "rail cruisers" on a section of the branch line between Mamaku and Tarukenga (since 2011), with plans to later extend to Rotorua-Mamaku. They have constructed a station at Mamaku and plan to build another in Rotorua when services are extended there.

See also 
 Mountain Rimu Timber Company tramway

References

Citations

Bibliography 

 

 
 Hermann, Bruce J; North Island Branch Lines pp 31–35 (2007, New Zealand Railway & Locomotive Society, Wellington)

External links
1891 paper on the Rotorua Railway by James Stewart CE
 1893 Tarukenga
 Rotorua 1896, 1901 and outside, 1905, 1930s, 1960s

Railway lines opened in 1893
Railway lines closed in 2001
Railway lines in New Zealand
Rail transport in Waikato
Rail transport in the Bay of Plenty Region
3 ft 6 in gauge railways in New Zealand
Closed railway lines in New Zealand